Peter Donnelly (born 3 December 1951) is a British judoka. He competed in the men's middleweight event at the 1980 Summer Olympics.

References

External links
 

1951 births
Living people
British male judoka
Olympic judoka of Great Britain
Judoka at the 1980 Summer Olympics
Place of birth missing (living people)